Leptus is a genus of large mites belonging to the family Erythraeidae; they resemble members of the related genus Balaustium, but can be distinguished by the eyes, which in Leptus species are set much further forward on the body than in Balaustium species.

The genus was first described in 1796 by Pierre André Latreille.

Selected species
Interim Register of Marine and NonMarine Genera lists 202 species.
 Leptus ariel Southcott, 1989
 Leptus berlesei
 Leptus clavatus
 Leptus intermedius Meyer & Ryke, 1959
 Leptus monteithi Southcott, 1993
 Leptus pozzoicus Ryszard, 2007
 Leptus trimaculatus 
 Leptus vertiformis

References

Trombidiformes